Răzvan Toni Augustin Grădinaru (born 23 August 1995) is a Romanian professional footballer who plays as a midfielder for Cypriot First Division club Karmiotissa.

Club career

Steaua București
He made his league debut on 16 April 2014 in Liga I match against FC Vaslui.

Politehnica Iași
On 12 January 2020, Liga I club FC Politehnica Iași announced the singing of Grădinaru.

Statistics

Statistics accurate as of match played 5 March 2023

Honours
Steaua București
Liga I: 2013–14
Cupa României runner-up: 2013–14
Supercupa României runner-up: 2014, 2015

Concordia Chiajna
Cupa Ligii runner-up: 2015–16

References

External links
 
 

1995 births
Living people
People from Zimnicea
Romanian footballers
Romania under-21 international footballers
Association football midfielders
Liga I players
Liga II players
Cypriot First Division players
FC Steaua București players
ASC Oțelul Galați players
CS Concordia Chiajna players
FC Politehnica Iași (2010) players
FC Voluntari players
FC Viitorul Constanța players
CS Gaz Metan Mediaș players
FC Dinamo București players
Karmiotissa FC players